Pauline Bewick (4 September 1935 – 28 July 2022) was an English-born Irish artist.

Bewick was born in Northumberland, England on 4 September 1935, and with her mother Alice ('Harry') and sister Hazel, moved many times between England and Ireland, before finally settling in County Kerry where she lived and worked, near Caragh Lake. She claimed to be distantly related to actress Meryl Streep, through her mother. She was a descendant of 19th-century artist Thomas Bewick.

In her teens, Bewick started studying at the National College of Art and Design in Dublin, and after graduation, moved to London. During her time there she illustrated a children's animated television series for the BBC, and also produced illustrations for books and magazines. On her return to Dublin she took jobs in singing and acting, and in 1957 opened her first exhibition there.

She married her husband Pat in 1963, and gave birth to two daughters, Poppy and Holly.In 2015,her husband Pat had contracted Alzheimer's disease.

A prolific artist, Bewick painted in oil, sculpted, and worked with cloth, but was most associated with watercolours. For the last decade or so she had been working on her Yellow Man project, a large collection of works featuring a cartoon-like yellow horned figure. In 2006 she donated a collection of 200 works including tapestries, wall hangings, watercolours and sketches to the state, now on permanent display in the Walton Building at the Waterford Institute of Technology, and in the Killorglin Library, Co. Kerry.

During Bewick's career she had illustrated several books and published several books of prints of her paintings. In 2015, at 80 years of age, she published her memoir "80: A Memoir".

Pauline Bewick died of cancer on 28 July 2022, at the age of 86.

References

External links

1935 births
2022 deaths
People from Northumberland
Aosdána members
Alumni of the National College of Art and Design
English women painters
20th-century Irish painters
21st-century Irish painters
Irish women artists
20th-century British women artists
21st-century British women artists
People from County Kerry
20th-century English women
20th-century English people
21st-century English women
21st-century English people